The 2010-11 is Al Talaba's 36th season in the Iraqi Premier League. Al Talaba will competing in the Iraqi Premier League and in the AFC Cup.

Squad

Transfers

In

Out

Competitions

Iraqi Premier League

Matches

AFC Cup

Group D

Al Talaba seasons
Al Talaba